Somabrachys codeti is a moth in the Somabrachyidae family. It was described by Jules Léon Austaut in 1880.

References

Zygaenoidea
Moths described in 1880